The Montenegro women's national volleyball team is the national team of Montenegro. It is governed by the Volleyball Federation of Montenegro and takes part in international volleyball competitions.
Soon after the Montenegrin independence referendum, Volleyball Federation of Montenegro founded national teams. Women's team started to play in 2008, with the first match against Albania (3:0, friendly game).
Same year, Montenegro played its first games in official competitions - against Georgia in 2009 European Volleyball Championship qualifiers.

List of official matches
Montenengro played its first official match at May 2008. Below is a list of all official matches played by the national team since Montenegrin independence.

Note: Montenegro scores first

Montenegro vs. other countries 
Below is the list of performances of Montenegro women's national volleyball team against every single opponent.

Last update: September 22, 2019.

See also
 Montenegro women's national volleyball team
 Volleyball Federation of Montenegro (OSCG)
 Montenegrin women's volley league

Montenegro women's national volleyball team